Alexandra "Sasha" Kropotkin (1887–1966) was a New York-based writer and Russian language translator. Born in British exile to the Russian scientist and anarchist Peter Kropotkin, the socially prominent family returned to Russia from the 1917 revolution through his death several years later. Upon moving to New York, in her women's column byline she retained the royal honorific ("princess") that her father, a descendant of Kropotkin nobility, had disowned. She translated Russian literature into English and wrote a Russian cookbook that The New York Times considered best-in-class.

Early life and career 

Alexandra Petrovna Kropotkin was born on April 15, 1887, in Bromley, London, where her family was living in exile. She was the sole child of anarchist luminary Peter Kropotkin (1842–1921) and was named after his brother, Alexander, who killed himself the year prior. The Kropotkins descend from an early medieval Russian ruler, Rurik, but her father disowned his royal title of "prince" and was, in turn, disowned by his father. In their English exile, the family was socially prominent at the turn of the century and hosted salons on Sundays. Following the 1917 Russian Revolution, they returned to Russia, where Alexandra stayed until 1921. After the death of her father, she settled in New York.

Kropotkin, like her father, cared little for her royal title but used it to establish her American career with the byline "Princess Alexandra Kropotkin". She wrote "To the Ladies!", a regular column in the general interest magazine Liberty from 1931 to 1942. She continued to write on cooking, home economics, etiquette, relationships, and other topics intended for women readers. Her Russian cookbook, How to Cook and Eat in Russian, was reissued by Scribner's in 1964 as The Best of Russian Cooking. The New York Times Book Review considered it the best cookbook on the subject. She also produced an English translation of Crime and Punishment, a revised English edition of The Brothers Karamazov, and Russian translations of several George Bernard Shaw plays.

Personal life 

Kropotkin, known as Sasha, promoted her father's legacy but was not an anarchist herself, a subject of disappointment for his followers. She spoke publicly about his memory at the Libertarian Book Club and maintained connection with his social group. At the time of her 1927 arrival in New York, Kropotkin favored the Soviet system and opposed both its communist government and any potential restoration of the czarist order. In the 1964 United States presidential election, Kropotkin supported the conservative Barry Goldwater.

While living in London, Kropotkin had a relationship and brief affair with author W. Somerset Maugham. Several of Maugham's characters are based on her. The two later reunited in Russia when Maugham was on an espionage mission and Kropotkin volunteered as his translator. She introduced Maugham to Alexander Kerensky, attended their weekly dinners, and sometimes hosted at her apartment.

Kropotkin married Boris Lebedev, a young Social Revolutionary Party member, in 1910. They divorced in 1920. While in Russia, Kropotkin met the newspaper journalist Lorimer Hammond, whom she married in August 1927. Her only child, an ambulance nurse, died in London in 1944. Kropotkin died in New York on July 4, 1966.

References

External links 

 Full text of How to Cook and Eat in Russian

1887 births
1966 deaths
People from Bromley
People from New York City
Soviet emigrants to the United States
American cookbook writers
American translators
Peter Kropotkin
20th-century translators
Expatriates from the Russian Empire in the United Kingdom